Château de Candale is a château in the commune of  Doazit in Landes département, Nouvelle-Aquitaine, France.

The château was built at the end of the 16th century by the lords of Foix-Candale, who made themselves masters of the barony of Doazit from the 15th century.

Notes

Houses completed in the 16th century
Châteaux in Landes (department)